Ahwatukee Foothills (also Ahwatukee) is an urban village of Phoenix, Arizona. Ahwatukee forms the southernmost portion of Phoenix, and is considered part of the East Valley region of the Phoenix metropolitan area.

In 2022, Niche rated Ahwatukee "#1 in Best Neighborhoods to Live in Phoenix."

History 
Prior to the area's development into the community it is known today, the name "Ahwatukee" referred, at times, to a since-demolished house that sat in an area near Sequoia Trails and Appaloosa Drive, west of the Warner-Elliot Loop.

Beginnings 
At least two major thoroughfares in today's Ahwatukee are named after people who claimed lands in the area, in the decades following the signing of the Homestead Act in 1862. Warner Road was named after Samuel Warner of Kansas, while Elliot Road was named after Reginald Elliott of California. Both claimed lands in an area now known as Tempe. A third man, Arthur Hunter, claimed land within an area now known as Ahwatukee. The street known today as 48th Street was, for a time, named Hunter Drive, after Arthur Hunter. Hunter is rumored to have, in the 1940s, disassembled and buried in the Ahwatukee desert a Studebaker auto purportedly owned by Al Capone.

Ahwatukee ranch 
One of the first houses in the area was built by Dr. William Van Bergen Ames, who co-founded Northwestern University's now-closed Dental School.

At the time, the Chandler Arizonan newspaper called the house, built in the foothills of the South Mountain, "unmatched in scope and size". The house was noted to be a  winter residence, designed by prominent Phoenix architect Lester Mahoney, with construction starting in 1921.

The house was given the name "The Mystic House" by the Chandler Arizonan, due to its cost, size, and isolated location. The Ames, however, called it Casa de Sueños. They moved into the house on Thanksgiving of 1921, but Dr. Ames died suddenly in February 1922. Ames' wife continued to spend her winters at the house until her death in 1933.

Following Ames' wife's death, the Ames' property in Ahwatukee was willed to St. Luke's Hospital. The property was bought by Helen Brinton in 1935, who gave the house (and eventually the area) the name it is known by today (as explained below). Brinton died in 1960, and the house was demolished in 1979.

Proving grounds 
In 1946, the International Harvester Company rented land from a United States Army tank testing facility located west of today's Lakewood community, for use as truck and heavy equipment proving grounds.

The grounds were designed to stress-test trucks and heavy equipment with, among other things, a  test track, dirt tracks, a special testing area with 20 to 60% grade, service shops, and a runway for company executives. The grounds were sold to a property development company in 1983, due to a combination of economic issues, labor union problems, and a patent infringement judgement against the company. The area is now a part of The Foothills and Club West developments.

Development 
Development of Ahwatukee began in 1970, when Presley Development Company, led by Randall Presley, bought  of land. The land included Ahwatukee Ranch, then owned by a land syndicate led by an Arizona State University English professor, as well as land owned by a local moving and storage firm. Presley originally planned for the area to be a retirement community, but later devised a mix of retirement living, family living, and light commercial zoning for the area.

Presley Development was noted to have a role in Ahwatukee eventually becoming a part of Phoenix, instead of neighboring Chandler or Tempe, through a handshake deal between Maricopa County Supervisor Bob Stark, who was also an attorney with Presley Development, and Mayor of Phoenix John D. Driggs. However, Chandler and Tempe officials were noted to have refused offers of annexing Ahwatukee.

Phoenix annexed the area in stages, from 1980 to 1987. It has been suggested that Phoenix's annexation of Ahwatukee had, to a degree, affected Tempe's future development.

Plans for Ahwatukee were approved by Maricopa County in November 1971, and 17 model homes were opened in an area near 50th Street and Elliot Road in 1973.

In the same year as the model homes’ opening, the Arizona State Legislature set aside $5 million to build a prison near the proving grounds. Plans for the prison, however, were later scrapped.

The area's first elementary school, Kyrene de los Lomas, opened in 1976, while Mountain Pointe High School opened as the area's first high school in 1991.

Etymology 
There exist three theories surrounding the name "Ahwatukee", with all three claiming the name has roots in the Crow language.

Some stories of the name's origin trace back to Brinton, who chose a Crow-rooted name for her new property due to her time among the Crow Nation tribal members in Wyoming, and the influence it subsequently had on her.

House of dreams
Some sources claim the name is a Crow term for house of your dreams, house of my dreams, or house of dreams

Until at least 2006, the Ahwatukee Foothills Chamber of Commerce acknowledged house of dreams as the meaning of the area's name.

However, according to the Crow language dictionary maintained by the Crow Language Consortium, the Crow word for "house" is ashé, and the Crow word for "dream" is baashíale or balewaashíale.

Land on the other side of the hill
Some sources claim the name is a Crow term for land on the other side of the hill, based on the Crow word awe chuuke. According to the same Crow dictionary, the word awé means "ground", "land", or "earth", and the word chúuke means "over the ridge", "over the hill", or "the next valley over".

Flat land
According to one source, the name closely resembles a Crow term for "flat land" or "prairie". According to the Crow language dictionary maintained by the Crow Language Consortium, the Crow word for "flat land" is "alawachúhke".

Geography 

The Ahwatukee Foothills Village is bordered by Interstate 10 to the east, South Mountain to the north, and the Gila River Indian Community & Loop 202 to the west and south. Ahwatukee is geographically isolated from the rest of Phoenix, and was once seen as appropriate for semi-rural development.

Demographics 
Based on 2016 estimates, the Ahwatukee Foothills Village has 83,464 residents. 83% of the population are White, 6.5% are Asian, 5.6% are Black or African American, 1.6% are Native American and 3.3% identify as some other race. 12.3% of the population is Hispanic.

Due to the community's predominantly Caucasian racial makeup, the area has been called "All-White-tukee".

Education

Public 
K-8 public school students in the area attend schools operated by the Kyrene School District. In fact, Ahwatukee-based schools constitute 12 out of 25 (48%) of Kyrene's schools.

High school students go to one of two in the area: Desert Vista and Mountain Pointe. Both schools are operated by the Tempe Union High School District

Private 
There are a number of private schools in Ahwatukee. One of the schools, Summit School of Ahwatukee, is ranked as one of the most expensive private schools in the Phoenix area by The Arizona Republic in 2014.

Infrastructure

Transportation 
The community is served by the ALEX neighborhood circulator, which is operated by Valley Metro Bus. Riders, however, have complained of poor service after a new contractor took over the route in 2016. Portions of Ahwatukee are also served by Valley Metro Routes 56-Priest Drive, 108-Elliot Road, 140-Ray Road, 156-Chandler Boulevard/Williams Field Road, and the I-10 East RAPID route.

As a result of having access points only via 48th Street in the northeastern part of the area, and a number of east–west crossings over I-10, Ahwatukee has been called the world's largest cul-de-sac. The building of Loop 202's South Mountain Freeway segment, however, has given the area a western gateway, via a series of exits along the southern border of the community.

References

External links 
 Ahwatukee Foothills News: Community News & Events

Urban villages of Phoenix, Arizona
1971 establishments in Arizona